The Sheshnarayan Temple is an ancient Hindu temple complex in Sheshnarayan Village Development Committee (VDC). The site is near the ancient town of Pharping, which lies approximately 20 kilometers south-west of Kathmandu, Nepal.

Mythological Origins
The temple is one of the four Narayana temples of the Kathmandu Valley, a World Heritage Site. The other three are Icchangu Narayan, Bishanku Narayan and Changu Narayan. These temples, which stand in the four cardinal directions, are believed to be built during the reign of the Licchavi king Vishnugupta. Their locations in the cardinal directions and on hilltops was to guard the Kathmandu Valley.

References

Hindu temples in Kathmandu District
Vishnu temples in Nepal